William Maughan may refer to:

 William Maughan (footballer) (1894–1916), English footballer
 William Ryott Maughan (1863–1933), English-born Australian politician